Omonogawa Gymnasium (雄物川体育館) is an indoor sporting arena located in Omonogawa, Yokote, Akita, Japan. It hosts indoor sporting events such as basketball,  volleyball and table tennis. It hosted National Sports Festival of Japan volleyball games in 2007.

Facilities
Main arena - 1,400m2 
Training room - 280m2 
3 Conference rooms - 40m2, 62m2, 62m2
2 Changing rooms -36m2x2
Stage - 160m2

See also 
Keishi Handa
Makoto Hasegawa
Mitsuaki Sato
Kohei Suzuki
Daisuke Usami
Tomoko Yamatoya

References 

Sports venues in Akita Prefecture
Indoor arenas in Japan
Basketball venues in Japan
Yokote, Akita